BR-210 is a federal highway of Brazil.

The planning of the highway would consist of connecting Macapá, Amapá with the Brazil-Colombia border in the municipality of São Gabriel da Cachoeira, Amazonas. The highway would have 2,454.7 km (1,525.3 mi) in total. However, only small stretches of it have been implemented. In 1976, the highway entered the Wajãpi Indigenous Territory in Amapá. The invasion was repelled by the indigenous leadership who expelled the intruders between the 1980s and the 1990s,
and therefore, the highway will probably never be completely built.

References

Federal highways in Brazil
Transport in Roraima
Transport in Amapá
Transport in Amazonas (Brazilian state)
Transport in Pará